David Christopher Daniel Wahlgren (born 13 July 1966), better known by the stage name Papa Dee, is a Swedish rapper. His most commercially successful track is his version of the Cat Stevens song "The First Cut Is the Deepest".

Music career 
Wahlgren debuted in 1988 with the single "Funky Raggamuffin/Let the Music Play", a mixture of dancehall and hip hop. He then joined the Stonefunkers and became the group's rapper. This was followed by a few years of cooperation with Rob'n'Raz. Wahlgren then went solo, and had his breakthrough in 1990 with the album  Lettin' Off Steam, which was predominantly hip hop and dancehall. His next album, One Step Ahead, had elements of soul and reggae, mixing song and rap. His 1994 release, Original Master, produced by Denniz Pop at Cheiron Studio, incorporated  Euro disco into his music.

During the 1990s and 2000s, he released several albums, often in cooperation with Desmond Foster and a couple with Soundism. 2001, Soundism also produced the Papa Dee song "Hottie Hottie Girls" featuring Lady Saw, Jamaica's prime female dancehall star. Kent (Gillström) Isaacs also produced a couple of Papa Dee's more daring and innovative albums. One of the albums they did together was the cover album, recorded in Jamaica, with reggae musicians including Horse-Mouth, Flabba Holt and Chinna Smith.
He is also a member of The Brooklyn Funk Essentials and of Dubchek with David Barratt.

His songs have been featured in several feature films including Predator 2, starring Danny Glover. In 1997 Dubchek made music for the critically acclaimed Two Girls and a Guy featuring Robert Downey, Jr. and Heather Graham. 
In the Swedish feature film/comedy Smala Sussie Papa Dee was credited both featuring as himself onscreen and as songwriter.

PD composed music for the stage (Top Dog/ Underdog at Stockholms Stadsteater)

Due to his prolific yet flexible imprint Papa Dee has enjoyed a successful career as one of  Sweden's most sought after voice artists dubbing cartoons and movies alike.

Partial voice work
 In the 1990s, Wahlgren dubbed Buster Bunny in Tiny Toon Adventures, rendering that of the character's original voice actor, Charlie Adler  
 He took on Eddie Murphy's character in "Mulan" (1998) and "Mulan 2" (2005) as Mushu
 In Snow Dogs (2002)  he rendered Cuba Gooding Jr's character .
 He also dubbed Will Smith in the Swedish release of "Shark Tale/Hajar som Hajar" (2004) - he featured as Oscar.
 In Space Chimps (2008)  he voiced Andy Samberg's character Ham 3.

As founding member of the NYC groove collective Brooklyn Funk Essentials he has recorded 4 full-length albums:

 Cool and Steady and Easy (1994)
 In the Buzz Bag (1998)
 Make Them Like It (2000)
 Watcha Playin’ (2009)

As Dubchek with David Barrat, Papa Dee recorded full-length albums
 Down Memory Gap Lane (1998)
 The Far East End (2010)

Highlights as featuring guest artist include:
 Leftfield's Leftism on the track Release the Pressure - additional vocals (1995)
 Titiyo My Body says Yes (1990)
 Mad Professor compilation DJ’ s Choice Tribute to MLK (1990)
 Diana King's album Respect (2002) in the duet Keep It On The Downlow

In 2001 Chrysler used his track ”Ispy” for its worldwide commercial.

Between 2000-2008 Papa Dee hosted his own radio show, P3 Rytm for SR, the Swedish National Radio Network

2012: Back on the move Papa Dee's  currently working on his book Was Jean Baptiste Bernadotte a blackman? and his upcoming album Fall From Grace is in the final stages.

Personal life 
Wahlgren was born in Gothenburg, Sweden, to a Swedish mother and a Ghanaian father. His father left the family when he was a small child.

On 14 September 2008, Wahlgren was arrested and charged with grave assault (Swedish: grov misshandel) with bodily harm to his wife Andrea on a street and in their apartment. His wife categorically denied that maltreatment had taken place and later wrote a book, En Fjärils Kamp (A Butterfly's Struggle), about how she was not heard in the trial. Despite this, a Swedish lower court found him guilty of a lesser charge of assault (Swedish: misshandel) on 20 October 2008 based on testimony from multiple witnesses and he was fined SEK 8,700. In 2010, the Swedish High Court acquitted him of the other charges of assaulting his wife in their apartment after she denied the assault. Papa Dee was awarded SEK 25,000 for the suffering as a result of the prosecution and SEK 18,045 for lost income and costs. Papa Dee and Andrea Wahlgren divorced in 2012.

Discography

Albums
 Lettin' Off Steam (1990)
 One Step Ahead (1993)
 Original Master (1994)
 The Journey (1996)
 Island Rock (1998)
 The Man Who Couldn't Say No (2001)
 Live It Up! (2004)
 A Little Way Different (2008)
 Fall From Grace (2012)

Singles

Singles as featured artist

Other appearances
 Debut studio album - The Bitter Twins (TBA)

See also 
 Swedish hip hop

References

External links 
Papa Dee's Website
Soundtracks for Predator 2

1966 births
Living people
People from Gothenburg
Swedish people of Ghanaian descent
Swedish rappers
Swedish reggae musicians
Dancehall musicians
Ragga musicians
Brooklyn Funk Essentials members
English-language singers from Sweden
Melodifestivalen contestants of 2005